Watrap ) is a taluk in Virudhunagar District, in the Indian state of Tamil Nadu.

History 
Watrap's traditional name before the British came was Vatratha Iruppu, which translates as "surplus water".

Culture 
A Perumal temple (Pěrumāḷ Kōyil, பெருமாள் கோயில்) sits in the centre of the village and a Shiva and Hanuman temple is at the outskirts of the village.

The holy uphill shrine "Sundara Mahalingam (Lord Shiva) temple" (also known as Thaani Paarai and Sathuragiri Malai) is there. Aadi amavasai (New Moon Day in the month of Aadi) is when devotees throng here.

A Krishna, Rukmini and Sathyabama temple called Gopala Swamy Malai tops a small hill, 22 km from Watrap. A Shiva Cave temple called Motta Malai is 16 km from Watrap.

Economy 
Agriculture is the primary livelihood. The main work is cultivatioagriculture, led by paddy, coconut and cotton. 

Branches of State Bank of India, Union Bank of India, Virudhunagar District Cooperative Bank and Rural Cooperative Bank are there.

Education 
Three government-aided schools and two private schools operate there.

Geography
The town sits on the bank of the Arjuna River. Dams Pilavakal (பிளவக்கல் அணை) and Kovilaaru provide irrigation.

Sathuragiri Hills contains dense tropical greenery, undisturbed forests and wildlife. Natural caves, some 2 km away from Sathuragiri temple and a fresh water pond at the top of the hill attract visitors. Perrumal Mottai is the highest and coldest spot in these hills.

Natural spring Maavuthu (big spring) us 8 km from Watrap. It is situated at the foot of the western Ghats.

References

Villages in Virudhunagar district
Taluks of Virudhunagar district